George Alphonsus Pattison (14 July 1889 – 6 March 1951) was an Australian rules footballer who played with Fitzroy in the Victorian Football League (VFL).

Notes

External links 

1889 births
1951 deaths
Australian rules footballers from Victoria (Australia)
Fitzroy Football Club players
Euroa Football Club players